Dominique Colonna (born 4 September 1928 in Corte, Haute-Corse) is a French former footballer who played as a goalkeeper.

Honours
Nice
 French championship: 1956

Reims
 French championship: 1958, 1960, 1962
 Coupe de France: 1958
 Trophée des champions: 1958
 European Cup: runner-up 1959

References

External links
 
 

1928 births
Living people
People from Corte, Haute-Corse
Association football goalkeepers
French footballers
Footballers from Corsica
France international footballers
USC Corte players
Montpellier HSC players
Stade Français (association football) players
OGC Nice players
Stade de Reims players
Ligue 1 players
1958 FIFA World Cup players
French football managers
French people of Italian descent
Cameroon national football team managers
Sportspeople from Haute-Corse